Footreading, also known as "solestry" (coined from sole, on the analogy of palmistry), is a method of divination Indian era by means of the foot. It involves the observation and interpretation of foot structure, skin (e.g., texture, blemishes, pigmentation) and toe nails, which are believed to reflect a person's emotions or character.

See also 
Reflexology
Ho No Hana

References

Further reading
 Stormer, Chris. Language of the Feet.
 Somogyi, Imre. Reading Toes - Your Feet as Reflections of Your Personality.

Divination
Foot